Mika Poutala (born 20 June 1983) is a Finnish speed skater who held a Finnish record in the sport. He finished 22nd at Speed skating at the 2006 Winter Olympics – Men's 500 metres. He has a business education and represented Finland at the 2010 Winter Olympics.

References 

1983 births
Finnish male speed skaters
Finnish Pentecostals
Speed skaters at the 2006 Winter Olympics
Speed skaters at the 2010 Winter Olympics
Speed skaters at the 2014 Winter Olympics
Speed skaters at the 2018 Winter Olympics
Olympic speed skaters of Finland
Sportspeople from Helsinki
Living people